Josip Filipović, Freiherr (Baron) von Philippsberg, also Josef von Philippovich or Joseph Philippovich (April 1818 – 6 August 1889), was an Austro-Hungarian general (Feldzeugmeister).

Life and career
Filipović was born in the Military Frontier town of Gospić, then in Austrian Empire. He joined the Austrian Army in 1836 and became major in 1848. He fought under Josip Jelačić in Hungary, helping to quell the 1848 Revolutions. 

He became colonel and commander of the 5th border regiment in 1857, and scored victories at the Battle of Solferino in 1859 and in the Austro-Prussian War in 1866. At one point He was commander of a Viennese division and for a short time was promoted from general to colonel general. 

In 1859 he became major general and fought with the 6th corps in Italy, for which he was rewarded with the hereditary title of Freiherr. In 1866 he fought in Bohemia campaign with the 2nd corps.

Filipović moved further up through the ranks, stationed in Vienna, Tyrol, Vorarlberg and Brno, where he was made Feldzeugmeister in January 1874. In June 1874, he became the commander of the army in Bohemia, a position he would hold until his death.

In July 1878 he commanded the troops invading Bosnia and Herzegovina. After three months of battle his troops captured Sarajevo on 19 August, which then became the capital. The occupation of Herzegovina was assigned to his subordinate Feldmarschalleutnant Stjepan Jovanović. He returned to Vienna in 1880 and to Prague in 1882.

Filipović died in Prague (at the time Austro-Hungarian Empire, now Czech Republic). For his merits he was awarded the Commander's Cross of the Order of Maria Theresa in 1879.

See also
 List of Military Order of Maria Theresa recipients of Croatian descent
 List of Croatian soldiers
 Croatian nobility

References

External links 
 Biography

1818 births
1889 deaths
Croatian military personnel in Austrian armies
Austro-Hungarian Army officers
Barons of Croatia
People from Gospić
19th-century Austrian people
19th-century Croatian people
Croatian Austro-Hungarians
Croatian nobility
Governors of Bosnia and Herzegovina
Barons of Austria
Commanders Cross of the Military Order of Maria Theresa
Grand Crosses of the Order of Saint Stephen of Hungary
Kingdom of Dalmatia
People of the Military Frontier
19th-century Croatian nobility
History of Gospić